The Senate Foreign Relations Subcommittee on Western Hemisphere, Transnational Crime, Civilian Security, Democracy, Human Rights, and Global Women's Issues is one of seven subcommittees of the Senate Foreign Relations Committee.

Jurisdiction
This subcommittee deals with all matters concerning U.S. relations with the countries of the Western Hemisphere, including Canada, Mexico, Central, and South America, Cuba, and the other countries in the Caribbean, as well as the Organization of American States.  This subcommittee’s regional responsibilities include all matters within the geographic region, including matters relating to (1) terrorism and non-proliferation; (2) crime and illicit narcotics; (3) U.S. foreign assistance programs; and (4) the promotion of U.S. trade and exports.

Also, this subcommittee has global responsibility for transnational crime, trafficking in persons (also known as modern slavery or human trafficking), global narcotics flows, civilian security, democracy, human rights, and global women’s issues.

Members, 117th Congress

See also

U.S. House Financial Services Subcommittee on International Organizations, Human Rights, and Oversight

External links
Senate Committee on Foreign Relations
Senate Foreign Relations Committee subcommittees and jurisdictions

 

Foreign Relations Senate International Operations and Organizations, Democracy and Human Rights